The Blind Man of Bethsaida is the subject of one of the miracles of Jesus in the Gospels. It is found only in Mark 8:22-26. The exact location of Bethsaida in this pericope is subject to debate among scholars but is likely to have been Bethsaida Julias, on the north shore of Lake Galilee.

According to Mark's account, when Jesus came to Bethsaida, a town in Galilee, he was asked to heal a blind man. Jesus took the man by the hand and led him out of the town, put some spittle on his eyes, and laid hands on him. "I see men like trees, walking", said the man. Jesus repeated the procedure, resulting in clear and perfect eyesight. "Neither go into the town," commanded Jesus, "nor tell anyone in the town." (New King James Version). Even though the story is found only in Mark, its authenticity may be supported by the criterion of embarrassment, since it could be argued that early Christians would not have been happy that Jesus had to give two blessings to achieve a proper result. Bede argues that "by this miracle, Christ teaches us how great is the spiritual blindness of man, which only by degrees, and by successive stages, can come to the light of Divine knowledge".

The New Testament describes only one other miracle performed in Bethsaida, the feeding of the multitude in Luke 9:16, although John 21:25 states that many more things were done by Jesus than have been recorded.

According to Matthew 11:21, Jesus cursed the city for its lack of belief in him despite "the mighty works done in you".

See also
 Life of Jesus in the New Testament
 Ministry of Jesus
 Parables of Jesus
 The Blind man Bartimaeus

References

Mythological blind people
Gospel of Mark
Miracles of Jesus
People from Bethsaida
People in the canonical gospels
Unnamed people of the Bible